István Kertész may refer to:

István Kertész (conductor) (1929–1973), Hungarian orchestral and operatic conductor
István Kertész (diplomat) (1904–1986), Hungarian diplomat